Phthersigena conspersa is a species of praying mantis in the family Nanomantidae. It is the type species of the genus Phthersigena and is native to Australia and New Guinea.

See also
List of mantis genera and species

References

Mantidae
Endemic fauna of Australia
Arthropods of New Guinea
Insects described in 1871